Eohyllisia allardi is a species of beetle in the family Cerambycidae. It was described by Breuning in 1958.

References

Agapanthiini
Beetles described in 1958
Taxa named by Stephan von Breuning (entomologist)